Mary Fairchild MacMonnies Low (1858–1946), born in New Haven, Connecticut   was an American painter who specialized in landscapes, genre paintings, and portraits.

Biography 

Mary Fairchild MacMonnies Low studied at the St. Louis School of Fine Arts (where she won a three years' scholarship), and in Paris at the Académie Julian and under Carolus Duran.  She had her own studio at 11 Impasse du Maine, (now part of Musée Bourdelle).

She married Frederick MacMonnies in 1888 and divorced him in 1909. She married  Will H. Low that same year.

Chicago mural

In April 1892, Low (then MacMonnies) was approached by Sarah Tyson Hallowell, agent for Bertha Palmer, the prime mover behind the Woman's Building at the World's Columbian Exposition, Chicago, 1893, to paint one of the two mural tympana planned for the building's interior. The other was Modern Woman, by Mary Cassatt.  The topic of Low's mural was Primitive Women and it was by all accounts at the time deemed to be the more successful of the two. These  were to be the only murals by these two painters. MacMonnies Low also exhibited her work at the Palace of Fine Arts at the 1893 Exposition.
 
She is represented in the Museum of Rouen, France, where she won a gold medal in 1903 and again in 1911.  She also won a gold medal at Dresden in 1902, at Marseilles in 1905, and the Julia Shaw prize of the Society of American Artists in 1902.  She became an associate of the National Academy of Design.

Paintings 

 Gathering Apples, 1866, St. Louis Art Museum, St. Louis, Missouri
 Gathering Flowers, 1890, St. Louis Art Museum, St. Louis, Missouri
 The Breeze, 1895, In the Nursery-Giverny Studio, 1897–98, and  C'est la Fete a Bebe, 1879–98, Terra Foundation for American Art, Chicago, Illinois
 Five O'Clock Tea (1891), Sheldon Swope Art Museum. This painting, also known as Tea at Fresco was exhibited at the Chicago Columbian Exposition, where "both the picture and the artist received favorable critical attention."
 "The Green Butterfly"
 "Early Morning Flower Market" (1910)
 "Christmas Eve in the Studio" (1911)
 "Little Women" (1911)
 "Portrait of W.H. Low" (1911), National Academy of Design. Will Low was her husband at that time.
 "Dogwood in Bloom" (1912) 
 "Portrait of E. S. D." (1913)

References

External links 

 Fairchield on artnet
 

1858 births
1946 deaths
Académie Julian alumni
American women painters
Artists from New Haven, Connecticut
19th-century American women artists
19th-century American painters
20th-century American women artists
20th-century American painters